The Deggendorf Institute of Technology, founded in 1994, is the University of Applied Sciences in Lower Bavaria, Germany. In addition to its undergraduate and graduate courses, the Deggendorf Institute of Technology offers doctoral programmes in cooperation with the Charles Sturt University. Several new buildings have been added to its campus.

History 
The Deggendorf Institute of Technology (DIT) was founded in 1994. The campus at the Danube river was used from 1998. The R&D labs were developed in 1999. The Innovation and Technology Campus Deggendorf (ITC1) opened in 2001. Faculties were established in 2006, and the bachelor's and master's degree titles were introduced in 2007. Deggendorf University changed its official name to Deggendorf Institute of Technology (DIT) on 1 October 2013.

Facilities

The Deggendorf Institute of Technology provides student facilities. These include:
Career Centre
International Office
Language Centre
Library
Computer Facilities
Student Advice
University - sports
Childcare Centre
Intercultural Program

The International Office provides guidance and counselling to both German and international students. The Language Centre teaches students oral ability as well as listening comprehension skills. German is offered as a Foreign Language course along with French, Spanish, Portuguese, Czech, Russian, English.

The institute is affiliated with the World Tourism Organization.

Research

The Deggendorf Institute of Technology conducts research in the field of engineering with financial support from the Bavarian state government and in partnership with local companies.

References

External links
Deggendorf Institute of Technology

Deggendorf
Universities and colleges in Bavaria
1994 establishments in Germany
Educational institutions established in 1994
Deggendorf
Technical universities and colleges in Germany